"Never Been So Loved (In All My Life)" is a song written by Wayland Holyfield and Norro Wilson, and recorded by American country music artist Charley Pride.  It was released in June 1981 as the only single from his 1981 compilation album Greatest Hits.  The song was Pride's twenty-fifth number one single on the country chart.  The single stayed at number one for two weeks and spent a total of eleven weeks on the country chart.

Charts

References

1981 singles
1981 songs
Charley Pride songs
Songs written by Wayland Holyfield
Songs written by Norro Wilson
Song recordings produced by Norro Wilson
RCA Records singles